Tuina is a genus of moths in the subfamily Arctiinae.

Species
 Tuina cingulata Walker, 1854
 Tuina maurella Draudt, 1919

References

Natural History Museum Lepidoptera generic names catalog

Lithosiini
Moth genera